Bucz Nowy  is a settlement in the administrative district of Gmina Przemęt, within Wolsztyn County, Greater Poland Voivodeship, in west-central Poland.

References

Bucz Nowy